United Nations Security Council resolution 600, adopted unanimously on 19 October 1987, recommended to the General Assembly that Nauru be allowed to become a party to the Stature of the International Court of Justice if they met the following conditions; 
(a) acceptance of the provision of the Statute of the ICJ; 
(b) acceptance of all the obligations of a Member of the United Nations under Article 94 of the Charter and 
(c) undertaking to contribute to the expenses of the Court as the General Assembly shall access from time to time, after consultation with the Government of the Republic of Nauru.

See also
 List of United Nations Security Council Resolutions 501 to 600 (1982–1987)

References
Text of the Resolution at undocs.org

External links
 

 0600
 0600
 0600
1987 in Nauru
October 1987 events